Oumar Traoré can refer to:

 Oumar Traoré (Malian footballer)
 Oumar Traoré (Senegalese footballer)